Ponta Delgada is the largest city and administrative capital of the Autonomous Region of the Azores in Portugal.

Ponta Delgada may also refer to:

 Ponta Delgada (district), a former district in the Azores, centered on the city
 Ponta Delgada, Santa Cruz das Flores, a civil parish in the municipality of Santa Cruz das Flores in the Azores
 Ponta Delgada, São Vicente, a civil parish in the municipality of São Vicente in Madeira, Portugal
 Ponta Delgada S.C., a former American soccer club based in Fall River, Massachusetts

See also
 Punta Delgada (disambiguation)
 Ponta (disambiguation)